Halm is a surname of Anglo-Saxon origin.  Notable people with the name include:

 Alfred Halm (1861–1951), Austrian screenwriter 
 Friedrich Halm (1806-1871), Austrian dramatist
 Günter Halm (1922-2017), German soldier
 Harry Halm (1901–1980), German actor
 Heinz Halm (born 1942), German scholar
 Jakob Karl Ernst Halm (1866-1944), German physicist
 Karl Felix Halm (1809-1882), German scholar
 Peter Halm (1854–1923), German etcher
 Renée Van Halm (born 1949), Dutch-Canadian artist
 Teo Halm (born 1999), American actor
 W. M. Q. Halm (1902–?), Ghanaian economist

References